Vikas Shankarrao Kumbhare (born 9 March 1962) is a member of the 12th, 13th and 14th Maharashtra Legislative Assembly. He represents the Nagpur Central Assembly Constituency. Kumbhare was also member of the 12th and 13th Assembly (2009–2014, 2014–2019).  Kumbhare has been mentioned as one of the more active members during one session (9–20 December 2013) of the Legislative Assembly.

Family and personal life
Vikas Khumbhare was born on 9 March 1962 in Nagpur in a Halba family. He married Lalita. They have two sons, Shreyash and Rohit.

Political career

 Kumbhare was elected as a Corporator.
 Elected as BJYM President from Central Nagpur.
 Elected as MLA from Central Nagpur.

Positions held

Within BJP

President, BJYM Nagpur Central
President, Nagpur (Central) BJP
Nagpur Municipal Corporation Corporator

References

Politicians from Nagpur
Living people
Maharashtra MLAs 2009–2014
1962 births
Maharashtra MLAs 2014–2019
Marathi politicians
Bharatiya Janata Party politicians from Maharashtra